is a song recorded by Japanese singer Misia, featuring Hide from Greeeen on the chorus backing vocals. It was released digitally by Ariola Japan on July 31, 2018, while the physical single was released on August 22, 2018. The song was written and composed by Greeeen and produced and arranged by Seiji Kameda. It is the theme song of the TBS drama series Gibo to Musume no Blues.

Chart performance
"Ai no Katachi" debuted at number 3 on Oricon's Digital Singles chart with 18,000 downloads sold, marking Misia's first entry onto the chart. The song peaked at number one the following week, with sales of 29,000 downloads, making it Misia's first song to reach the top of the Digital Singles chart. "Ai no Katachi" stayed at number-one for two consecutive weeks. The song also made its debut onto the Billboard Japan Hot 100 at number 23, and at number 5 on Billboard Japan's Download Songs chart. It rose to number ten on the Hot 100, becoming Misia's eighth top ten entry on the chart, and number two on the Download Songs chart the following week. "Ai no Katachi" debuted at number 3 and number 2, respectively, on the RecoChoku and Mora Weekly Singles charts. It then reached number one on both charts on its second week.

Track listing

Charts

Certifications

References

2018 singles
2018 songs
Misia songs
Japanese television drama theme songs
Ariola Japan singles
Song recordings produced by Seiji Kameda